Lady Dorothy Rachel Melissa Walpole Mills (11 March 1889 – 4 December 1959) was a British novelist and memoirist.

Family
She was born in Kensington, London, the daughter of Robert Horace Walpole, the 5th and final Earl of Orford, and his American-born wife, Countess Louise Melissa Corbin. Her half-sister is Lady Anne Berry (née Walpole), the Anglo-New Zealand horticulturist who founded Rosemoor Garden, Devon.
She was a Soroptimist and a Founder Member of SI Greater London, which was chartered in 1923.

Lady Dorothy married Captain Arthur F. H. Mills of the Duke of Cornwall's Light Infantry after he was wounded in the First World War in 1916, being presented at the ceremony with a wedding ring made from a bullet that had been surgically removed from his ankle after he was wounded in combat at La Bassée, France.  Mills was also an author of both fiction and non-fiction titles.  They later divorced in 1933 after he was discovered having an adulterous affair.

Career
Her travel adventures took her to places such as Liberia, the Bosphorous, Arabia, and Venezuela.  She is believed to be the first "white woman" to visit Timbuktu, as described in her travelogue The Road to Timbuktu [Duckworth & Co.: London, 1924].

After being severely injured in a car accident in 1929, she recovered and resolved to become the first to discover the source of the Orinoco River in 1931, leading to her book, The Country of the Orinoco (Hutchinson & Co.: London, 1931). While planning a trip to Egypt and the Middle East, her father, Lord Walpole, died in Manurewa, Auckland, New Zealand, on 27 September 1931.

Retirement
Her father's death allowed Lady Dorothy to access a trust fund left to her in 1918 by her American grandfather, Daniel Chase Corbin, of Spokane, Washington, a millionaire railroad and agricultural tycoon who mistrusted the Earl.

After her husband, Arthur, did not contest her filing for a divorce decree in London in 1932, it was finally granted in 1933. Lady Dorothy "retreated to a quiet and private life" at the seaside Steyning Mansions Hotel at Eastern Terrace in Brighton, publishing no more books before her death in 1959.

Bibliography

References

External links
 Lady Dorothy Mills official website
 Who Is George Mills?

1889 births
1959 deaths
English people of New Zealand descent
British memoirists
Writers from London
20th-century British novelists
20th-century memoirists